John Stewart (23 January 1929 – 10 January 2004) was a Scottish footballer, who played for Dunfermline Athletic, East Fife and Walsall. Stewart represented the Scottish League twice, in 1952.

References

1929 births
2004 deaths
Footballers from West Lothian
Scottish footballers
Association football wingers
Royal Albert F.C. players
Dunfermline Athletic F.C. players
East Fife F.C. players
Walsall F.C. players
Nuneaton Borough F.C. players
Scottish Football League players
English Football League players
Scottish Football League representative players
Scottish Junior Football Association players